Trap Pond State Park is a 3,653 acre (8.5 km²) Delaware state park located near Laurel, Delaware, USA. It is one of the largest surviving fragments of what was once an extensive wetland in what is now southwestern Sussex County.  The state park features an extensive patch of bald cypress trees.

Bald cypress ecosystem

The bald cypress is a wetland tree adapted to areas of calm, shallow standing water. Trap Pond State Park is the northernmost park in North America that includes cypress and bald cypress, although the actual range continues further north, ending just north of Georgetown, Delaware, in the Ellendale State Forest.

Many birds flock to stands of bald cypress, including great blue herons, owls, warblers, and pileated woodpeckers.  Birdwatchers can also see hummingbirds and bald eagles at Trap Pond in season.

Large specimens of American holly, the state tree of Delaware, can also be seen in the Trap Pond bottomland.

History
The rot-resistant wood of Trap Pond's bald cypress trees was extensively harvested starting in the 18th century.  The lumbermen extensively altered the morphology of the wetland, damming its outflow to create power for a small sawmill to cut the timbers.  This dam helped to create what is now Trap Pond, named after the Trap Mills, which were known by that name as early as the 1860s.  The pond was enlarged in later years as nearby farmers laid down drainage tiles to de-water their wetlands for agriculture.  After the old-growth cypress timber had been harvested, the pond and adjacent surviving wetlands were re-used as the drainage sump for the surrounding farmers of Sussex County.

In the 1930s, the federal Civilian Conservation Corps listed the pond as a place of recreation development.  The Delaware legislature took over the land and named it as a state park on June 22, 1951, becoming the first state park in Delaware.

Recreation

Boating
The partly sheltered waters of Trap Pond (90 acres/0.4 km²) are now managed as a waterway for family recreation.  A concessioner rents canoes, kayaks, rowboats, and pedal boats.  There is also a launching ramp for privately owned shallow-draft vessels.

Fishing opportunities concentrate on panfish such as crappie and bluegill, with some bass and pickerel as well.

Bald Cypress Nature Center
The Bald Cypress Nature Center features a display of some of the reptiles, fish and amphibians found in Trap Pond, as well as other natural history exhibits and a nature library.  The nature center is open seven days a week during spring and summer.  Programs include hayrides, guided nature walks and hikes, naturalist-led pontoon boat tours and outdoor skills workshops.

Camping
Trap Pond State Park's campground has 142 total campsites including 130 with water and electric hookups, 10 primitive walk-in tent sites, and 2 primitive areas available only for youth groups. 8 camping cabins and 2 yurts are also available for rent. Campsites with electric and water are open year-round, with the primitive sites open from March 1 until November 30. Trap Pond Campground is best known for its annual Halloween weekend festivities.

Swimming
A sandy swimming beach was among the amenities already in place when the Delaware State Parks Commission took over Trap Pond in 1951, but is no longer available after being permanently closed on May 17, 2000.

See also
Delaware Department of Natural Resources and Environmental Control

References

External links
Trap Pond State Park

State parks of Delaware
Parks in Sussex County, Delaware
Nature centers in Delaware
Protected areas established in 1951
Civilian Conservation Corps in Delaware
1951 establishments in Delaware